Talysh Mountains is a mountain range in far southeastern Azerbaijan and far northwestern Iran within Ardabil Province and Gilan Province.

They are a northwestern subrange of the Alborz Mountains that run along the southern Caspian Sea on the Iranian Plateau.

Geography
The Talysh Mountains extend southeastward from the Lankaran Lowland in southeastern Azerbaijan to the lower part of the Sefid Rud (White River) in northwestern Iran.

A few peaks rise above 10,000 ft (3,000 m).

Geology
Geologically, the Talish Mountain Range is made mainly of the Late Cretaceous volcano-sedimentary deposits with a strip of Paleozoic rocks and a band of Triassic and Jurassic rocks in the southern parts, both in a north-west-southeast direction.

Ecology
The maximum annual precipitation in the Talysh Mountains is between 1,600 mm to 1,800 mm, which along the Lankaran Lowland is the highest precipitation in both Azerbaijan and Iran. The humid semi-subtropical coastal lowlands along the Caspian Sea, including the Lankaran Lowland, lie at the eastern base of the mountains.

The Talysh Mountains are covered by lowland and montane forests. The area is part of the Caspian Hyrcanian mixed forests ecoregion.

The Caspian tiger used to occur in the Talysh Mountains.

Gallery

See also 
Lankaran Lowland — see for map of range

References

Mountain ranges of Azerbaijan
Mountain ranges of Iran
Landforms of Ardabil Province
Landforms of Gilan Province
Astara District
Lankaran District
Lerik District
Yardimli District
Late Cretaceous Asia
Talysh